Dawn is the fifth studio album by the German rock band Eloy released in 1976. Much like their previous album, Power and the Passion, their fifth studio release follows a similar story format. The concept tells the tale of a man who after a sudden death comes back as a ghost. He tries to pass on his newly acquired knowledge to his loved one. The album ends with his dissolving into light, closing on the quote, "Nous sommes du soleil" ("We are of the sun").

Track listing
All music composed by Eloy.  All lyrics by Jürgen Rosenthal.
Side one
"Awakening" – 2:39
"Between the Times" – 6:07
a) "Between the Times" – 1:50
b) "Memory Flash" – 1:56
c) "Appearance of the Voice" – 1:12
d) "Return of the Voice" – 1:08
"The Sun-Song" – 4:55
"The Dance in Doubt and Fear" – 4:27
"Lost!? (Introduction)" – 5:20
Side two
"Lost?? (The Decision)" – 5:01
"The Midnight-Fight/The Victory of Mental Force" – 8:10
"Gliding Into Light and Knowledge" – 4:13
"Le Réveil du Soleil/The Dawn" – 6:49

Personnel
 Frank Bornemann – guitars, lead vocals
 Klaus Peter Matziol – bass, backing vocals
 Detlev Schmidtchen – keyboards, backing vocals, synthesizer, Mellotron, mini Moog, Hammond organ, piano, guitars
 Jürgen Rosenthal  – drums, voices, lyrics, cymbals, glockenspiel, gong, timbales, kettle drum, temple blocks, roto toms

Production
Arranged & produced by Eloy
Engineered by Georgi Nedeitschev

References

External links
 

1976 albums
Eloy (band) albums